is a 2010 rhythm game created by Sega and Crypton Future Media for the PlayStation Portable. The game is a sequel to the 2009 video game, Hatsune Miku: Project DIVA, and was first released on July 29, 2010 in Japan with no international release. Like the original the game primarily makes use of Vocaloids, a series of singing synthesizer software, and the songs created using these vocaloids most notably the virtual-diva Vocaloid Hatsune Miku.

Gameplay

The game primarily uses the same gameplay mechanics from the original game albeit with several changes. Most notable of which is that the game now uses the D-pad (arrow buttons) and a "hold and release" function for the face buttons in addition to the normal gameplay. Similar to the symbols of the first game, the game now includes colored arrows for example a blue arrow pointing downwards, this indicates that the player has to press "down" on the D-Pad and the "Cross" face button at the same time. The game also add a fourth difficulty, Extreme, to songs that is more difficult than the hard difficulty in the first game. The game will also introduce duets, as compared to only having solo songs in the first game, thus allowing players to select two modules instead. This also carries on into the Edit Mode of the game allowing players to create PVs for duets with two modules in them.

Song list
A total of 72 songs are available in the game; 52 songs (30 new and 22 old) are obtained normally by playing through the game, while 9 songs are only available through Edit Mode, and 11 songs are downloadable content available from the PlayStation Network.

Songs with a light blue background are returning songs from Hatsune Miku: Project DIVA.
Songs with a grey background can only be played in Edit Mode.
Songs with an orange background are DLC which returned as playable songs in Hatsune Miku: Project DIVA Extend.
Songs with a yellow background are DLC which are only available in the game.

DLC
Various packs of DLC were released for the game, including new modules, new rooms, new room items, and new songs and stages:
July 29, 2010 - The first DLC pack was released, containing two additional posters for room decoration.
August 26, 2010 - In observance of Hatsune Miku's 3rd birthday, a themed DLC pack was released, containing a themed room, two additional room items, and a poster room decoration.
August 31, 2010 - A new module, taken from the cover of the Hatsune Miku Append Vocaloid software, was released.
September 30, 2010 - The songs "The Disappearance of Hatsune Miku" and "StargazeR" were released.
October 28, 2010 - The "Hatsune Miku: Project DIVA 2nd x THE iDOLM@STER SP Collaboration" DLC packs were released, containing modules from THE iDOLM@STER SP for Miku, Rin, and Luka, Vocaloid versions of the franchise songs "GO MY WAY!!" and "relations", a 765 Production room and item, an THE iDOLM@STER character doll, and new room posters.
November 4, 2010 - In observance of MEIKO's 6th birthday, a themed DLC pack was released, including a themed room, a birthday cake room item, an "i Cup" room item, and a kimono module.
November 30, 2010 - Christmas modules for each character were released.
December 22, 2010 - A Christmas/Kagamine Rin and Len themed pack was released, containing a variety of Christmas themed items and room, a room poster and room item, the "-39's Giving Day Edition-" version of the song "Butterfly on Your Right Shoulder". The songs "Your Diva" and "Requiem for the Phantasma" were also released.
January 27, 2011 - In observance of Megurine Luka's 2nd birthday, a themed DLC pack was released, including a themed room, a birthday cake room item, a doll room item, a room poster and the song "Stardust Utopia". A winter-themed Miku module was also released.
February 17, 2011 - In observance of KAITO's 5th birthday, a themed DLC pack was released, including an ice-cream themed room and room decoration, a "Happy Birthday" ice cream cone room decoration, a poster, and a white suit module. The songs "Electric Angel" and "Time Limit" were also released.

Dreamy Theater 2nd
Similar to Hatsune Miku: Project DIVA, a companion game for the PlayStation 3, Hatsune Miku: Project DIVA Dreamy Theater 2nd, was released digitally via the Japanese PlayStation Store on August 4, 2011. Like its predecessor, the game features updated high-definition visual improvements over its respective PSP game while featuring the same content and PlayStation Trophies support, and requires the player to connect the PSP (with Project DIVA Extend) to the PS3 via USB to access the content in the game. Notable differences from the first game are that the player need only connect their PSP system once to transfer a save file rather than having it constantly connected via USB cable, as well as the addition of stereoscopic 3D for compatible TVs. Once the game has been unlocked by transferring a save file, all unlocked content from the player's PSP system will be available to play along with the songs from the first game as an added bonus.

References

External links
Official Site 

2010 video games
Japan-exclusive video games
Music video games
PlayStation Portable games
PlayStation 3 games
Sega video games
Creative works using vocaloids
Hatsune Miku: Project DIVA games
Video games developed in Japan